Robert Booth (fl. 1601) was an English politician.

He was a Member (MP) of the Parliament of England for New Shoreham in 1601.

References

16th-century births
17th-century deaths
English MPs 1601